Sayombhu Mukdeeprom (born 1970) is a Thai cinematographer, best known for his work on the films of Apichatpong Weerasethakul and Luca Guadagnino. Mukdeeprom has earned international acclaim for his photography on films such as the 2010 Cannes Film Festival winner Uncle Boonmee Who Can Recall His Past Lives and the 2017 Academy Award nominee Call Me by Your Name

Mukdeeprom collaborated with Luca Guadagnino on Ferdinando Cito Filomarino's Antonia (2015). Guadagnino and Filomarino developed an "exquisite and extraordinary" relationship with Mukdeeprom during the production of Antonia, the cinematographer's first non-Thai film.

He is also well-known for his work on the Thai art house film Uncle Boonmee Who Can Recall His Past Lives, which won the Palme d'Or at the 2010 Cannes Film Festival.

Filmography

Awards and nominations
 2007: Nominated – Asian Film Awards: Best Cinematographer - Sang sattawat
 Suphannahong National Film Awards: Outstanding Achievement in Cinematography 
 2008: Chaiya
 2009: Happy Birthday
 2011: Uncle Boonmee Who Can Recall His Past Lives 
 2014: Ruedoo ron nan chan tai
 2010: Won – Dubai International Film Festival: Best Cinematographer - Feature - Uncle Boonmee Who Can Recall His Past Lives 
 2017: Nominated – Critics' Choice Movie Awards: Best Cinematography - Call Me by Your Name
 2017: Won – Independent Spirit Awards: Best Cinematography - Call Me by Your Name
 2018: Won – Independent Spirit Awards: Best Cinematography - Suspiria
 2022: Honoured – Robby Müller Award:  Image maker award at 51st International Film Festival Rotterdam

References

External links
 
 Films Shot by Sayombhu Mukdeeprom
 Sayombhu Mukdeeprom at mubi.com

Sayombhu Mukdeeprom
Living people
Sayombhu Mukdeeprom
1970 births